Bokepyin Township (RTGS: Bok Pian) is a township of Kawthaung District, Taninthayi Division, Myanmar. The capital town is Bokepyin.

References

External links
Myanmar: Tanintharyi, Bokpyin and Kyunsu Township - Tanintharyi Region (as of 12 July 2011)

Townships of Taninthayi Region